State Route 200 (SR-200) is a  state highway in the U.S. state of Utah. It serves to connect Lewiston's Center Street (SR-61) to the Idaho border. The roadway continues north past the state line into the city of Preston, Idaho.

Route description
SR-200 begins eight blocks west of the city center of Lewiston along a roadway designated 800 West. Heading due north from Center Street (SR-61), SR-200 travels through rural farmland, only intersecting one street, 800 North, before reaching the Idaho state line. The Utah Department of Transportation (UDOT) classifies the route as a collector route. Every year, UDOT conducts a series of surveys on its highways in the state to measure traffic volume. This is expressed in terms of average annual daily traffic (AADT), a measure of traffic volume for any average day of the year. In 2012, UDOT calculated that 1,145 vehicles used the highway on an average day, representing a decrease in traffic over the last two years (1,170 in 2011, 1,175 in 2010). Eighteen percent of this was truck traffic.

History
The roadway linking Lewiston to Preston has existed since at least 1937.

Major intersections

References

External links

200
 200
Streets in Utah